Bundall is a suburb in the City of Gold Coast, Queensland, Australia.

Geography 
Bundall is bounded by the Slayter Road to the north, Bundall Road to the east, Nerang River to the south-east and south, and an unnamed canal from the Nerang River to the south-west and west.

Sorrento is a neighbourhood within the south of Bundall. It takes its name from a canal real estate development on the Nerang River that created 800 waterfront blocks and 400 "dry" blocks. The northernmost part of the suburb near the canals is also used for housing. There are commercial buildings to the north of Ashmore Road and the west of Bundall Road. The centre of the suburb provides a range of civic infrastructure including Southport Racecourse (with naming rights as Aquis Park ) and associated businesses and the Benowa Effluent re-pump station, part of the city's sewage and recycled water infrastructure.

History
The name Bundall is from the Aboriginal word for a species of prickly vine. The area was originally settled by British landowner Edmund Henry Price in 1862. He established the Bundall sugarcane plantation. The sugarcane was crushed at the Benowa sugar mill. Subsequently, the land was used for dairy farming, until it was developed for urban use.

Bundall Provisional School opened on 21 September 1885. It was renamed Benowa Provisional School in November 1900.  On 1 January 1909 it became Benowa State School.

In 1965 a group of Greek residents of the Gold Coast formed the Greek Orthodox Community of St Anna (Gold Coast and Districts) with the ambition of establishing a Greek Orthodox Church. In 1978, the first St Anna Greek Orthodox Church was built on land donated by Greek entrepreneur Peter Vaggelas to fulfill a pledge that his wife Betty had made to St Anna during the difficult birth of their daughter. The present St Anna's Church at 31A Crombie Avenue was built on land donated by Jim Raptis, President of the Greek Community.

The median age of the Bundall population was 42 years, 4 years above the national median of 38. 65.5% of people were born in Australia. The most common countries of birth were New Zealand 7.4% and England 4.4%. 80.0% of people only spoke English at home. Other languages spoken at home included Mandarin at 3.1%. The most common responses for religion were No Religion 28.7%, Catholic 24.1% and Anglican 21.1%.

Heritage listings 
There are a number of heritage sites in Bundall, including:

 8 Elliott Street: Gold Coast and Hinterland Historical Society Grounds

Slatyer Avenue

Slatyer Avenue is one of eleven local streets named after young men who died on active service in World War II. When the Bradbrook family farm at Bundall was subdivided for housing in the 1950s, Slatyer Avenue was named after two brothers – Allan and Gordon Slatyer, the only children of Francis Leichhardt and Hilda (Peggy) Slatyer of Surfers Paradise. Allan, an RAAF leading aircraftman, died in a training accident at Wagga Wagga on 29 August 1941.  He was 18 years old.  Gordon, an AIF infantryman, was killed in action on 3 August 1942 at El Alamein, Egypt.  He was 22 years old.

Education 
There are no schools in Bundall. The nearest primary schools are Surfers Paradise State School in neighbouring Surfers Paradise to the east, Benowa State School in neighbouring Benowa to the west and Bellevue Park State School in neighbouring Ashmore to the north-west. The nearest secondary schools are Benowa State High School in neighbouring Benowa to the west and Keebra Park State High School in neighbouring Southport to the north.

Sport 
Bundall is also the home of the Bundall Iceland Ice Rink, home of the Bartercard Gold Coast Blue Tongues ice hockey club, Queensland's only team in the Australian Ice Hockey League.

Amenities 
St Anna's Greek Orthodox Church is at 31A Crombie Avenue. Its feast days are 25 July, 9 September and 9 December.

Notable people 
Notable people from or who have lived in Bundall include:
 Justin Hickey, businessman, insurance executive and philanthropist

See also
 Suburbs of the Gold Coast

References

Sources 
 
 W.E Hanlon, The Early Settlement of the Logan and Albert Districts
 Steele, J.G., Aboriginal Pathways in Southeast Queensland and the Richmond River, p63

External links

 

Suburbs of the Gold Coast, Queensland
1862 establishments in Australia